Ronald Fair is an American A&R executive, record producer, record executive, musical arranger, recording engineer and conductor. In a career that has spanned over 30 years at major record labels he has produced and arranged hits for several artists, but he is best known as a "guru/mentor", guiding the careers of unknown artists. Among the artists he has mentored are Christina Aguilera, Vanessa Carlton, Keyshia Cole, The Black Eyed Peas and Fergie, and the Pussycat Dolls.

Career

Early career
Fair was born in Los Angeles, California, United States. Fair's childhood played an important role in his eventual career direction, saying in an interview with HitQuarters,
"My grandfather was a broadcaster who had built a remote facility for the purpose of producing a daily radio broadcast. Ever since I was two years old I was around microphones and consoles." During his childhood Fair was actively encouraged to pursue this career path, receiving various music tuition and being encouraged to take on the job training in multi-track recording. By the time he was 17 years old he was, in his words, "Very skilled with microphone technique and able to make a pretty convincing sounding recording."  Fair's first job in the music industry was a short stint in the mailroom of Far Out Productions, in September 1979. Far Out Productions was the production company headed by Jerry Goldstein and Steve Gold, and produced albums by, most notably, War and Tanya Tucker.

Fair taught recording production at the University of Sound Arts in Hollywood while at the same time developing a reputation as a motion picture musical soundtrack coordinator, with the multi-platinum successes of Pretty Woman and Reality Bites. In addition, during the early 1980s Fair worked as a recording engineer on such projects as the Slayer album Hell Awaits.

A&R career
During his career, Fair has produced multiple number one singles on the pop and R&B charts, including “Lady Marmalade” (Christina, Pink, Mýa, Lil' Kim), “Be Without You” (Mary J. Blige), “One” (Mary J. Blige & U2), “Big Yellow Taxi” (Counting Crows), “A Thousand Miles” (Vanessa Carlton), and “Where Is the Love?” (Black Eyed Peas). He was also the executive producer of “Beautiful” (Christina Aguilera), “Big Girls Don’t Cry” (Fergie), “Let’s Get It Started” (Black Eyed Peas), and many other hits. He was nominated for 6 Grammy awards and his recordings have won several Grammy awards, including those of Christina Aguilera, The Black Eyed Peas, Mary J. Blige and Queen Latifah.

In 2009, Fair engineered Lady Gaga's single “Speechless,” from her platinum album The Fame Monster. That year he also collaborated with Indian film composer A.R. Rahman to produce an English version of "Jai Ho", the hit song from the film Slumdog Millionaire.

Fair held the position of chairman at Geffen Records until joining Virgin Records. Prior to running Geffen Records, Fair was President of A&M Records for five years, and held senior A & R positions at RCA Records, Chrysalis Records, EMI Records, and Island Records-London.

In 2013, Fair was named the new Chief Creative Officer and Executive Vice President of Virgin Records. In his current position, he is in charge of rebuilding the recently struggling label. After a year with the company, he left Virgin Records in October 2014.

Fair is a celebrity judge on the Canadian television talent program Cover Me Canada.

On January 30, 2015, it was announced that Fair had signed on to Executive Produce TLC's fifth and final studio album.

Personal life
Ron Fair married singer-songwriter Stefanie Ridel, a member of the teen girl group Wild Orchid, on September 4, 2001. They have four children together. Fair enjoys gardening and has notably climbed Mount Kilimanjaro. Ron was previously married to Andrea Cooper Fair.

Discography
Notable Productions
 1990: Pretty Woman Soundtrack (Executive producer)
 1992: White Men Can't Jump Soundtrack (Executive producer)
 1994: Reality Bites Soundtrack (Executive producer)
 1994: Dumb & Dumber Soundtrack (Executive producer)
 2001: Legally Blonde Soundtrack (Executive producer)
 2002: Christina Aguilera - "Beautiful" (Executive producer)
 2002: Vanessa Carlton - "A Thousand Miles"
 2003: The Black Eyed Peas - "Where Is The Love?"
 2004: Vickie Natale - Like No Other (Executive producer)
 2005: Keyshia Cole - The Way It Is (Executive producer)
 2005: Pussycat Dolls - PCD (Executive producer)
 2006: Fergie - "Big Girls Don't Cry"
 2006: Gwen Stefani - The Sweet Escape (Executive producer)
 2007: Keyshia Cole - Just Like You (Executive producer)
 2008: Keyshia Cole - A Different Me (Executive producer)
 2009: Lady Gaga - "Speechless"
 2009: Pussycat Dolls - "Jai Ho! (You Are My Destiny)"
 2010: Keyshia Cole - Calling All Hearts (Executive producer)

Filmography
Film and television

References

External links
 
Ron Fair discographie at Discogs.com

American music industry executives
Record producers from California
Songwriters from California
A&R people
American Jews
Year of birth missing (living people)
Living people